Boron is a town and commune in the Cercle of Banamba in the Koulikoro Region of south-western Mali. As of 1998 the commune had a population of 32,250.

References

Communes of Koulikoro Region